The 2020 Bendigo Challenger was a professional tennis tournament played on hard courts. It was the first edition of the tournament which was a part of the 2020 ATP Challenger Tour. It took place in Bendigo, Australia between 12 and 18 January 2020.

Singles main-draw entrants

Seeds

 1 Rankings are as of 6 January 2020.

Other entrants
The following players received wildcards into the singles main draw:
 Aaron Addison
 Jai Corbett
 Jayden Court
 Jake Delaney
 Jesse Delaney

The following player received entry into the singles main draw as an alternate:
 Dane Sweeny

The following players received entry from the qualifying draw:
 Yoshihito Nishioka
 Yaraslav Shyla

Champions

Singles

  Steve Johnson def.  Stefano Travaglia 7–6(7–2), 7–6(7–3).

Doubles

  Nikola Ćaćić /  Denys Molchanov def.  Marcelo Arévalo /  Jonny O'Mara 7–6(7–3), 6–4.

References

2020 ATP Challenger Tour
2020 in Australian tennis
January 2020 sports events in Australia